Cyprus sent a delegation to compete at the 2008 Summer Paralympics in Beijing, People's Republic of China. Its delegation consisted in one track and field athlete (Antonis Aresti), one competitor in shooting (Evripides Georgiou), and two swimmers (Karolina Pelendritou and Andreas Potamitis).

The country won a total of four medals: one gold, two silver and one bronze. This was by far Cyprus' best performance ever at the Paralympics; over the course of its five previous participations, it had won a single medal: a gold in swimming in 2004.

Medalists

Sports

Athletics

Men's track

Shooting

Swimming

See also
Cyprus at the Paralympics
Cyprus at the 2008 Summer Olympics

External links
International Paralympic Committee

References

Nations at the 2008 Summer Paralympics
2008
Summer Paralympics